John Joseph O'Gorman C.S.Sp. (May 8, 1866–1935) was an Irish member of the Congregation of the Holy Spirit, who served as Bishop of Freetown in Sierra Leone, its first Roman Catholic bishop. He was the first Irish member of the order to be appointed Bishop.

Born in 1866 in Hacketstown, Co. Carlow, he attended Blackrock College in Dublin for his secondary schooling. He moved to France for further studies and to train for the Holy Ghost Fathers, and was ordained in 1889. He served in the United States. In 1903 he was appointed Vicar General to Sierra Leone, and Titular Bishop. 

He died in 1935, and is buried in Switzerland where he had retired, due to ill health. Bishop O'Gorman was succeeded by fellow Irish Holy Ghost Father the Corkman, Bartholomew Stanley Wilson as Bishop.

Reference

1866 births
Holy Ghost Fathers
Irish Spiritans
1935 deaths
People from County Carlow
Roman Catholic archbishops in Sierra Leone
Irish expatriate Catholic bishops